Ratanpur Group is a Bangladeshi diversified conglomerate based in Chittagong. It mostly known for its flagship company, Ratanpur Steel Re-Rolling Mills Limited (RSRM).

History 
Ratanpur Group was established in 1984 with the creation of Ratanpur Steel Re-Rolling Mills Limited (RSRM).

In August 2015, Bangladesh Bank approved the rescheduling of a 6.91 billion taka loan from Janata Bank to Ratanpur Group.

Ratanpur Group requested Bangladesh Bank to reschedule a 1.21 billion taka loan from Trust Bank Limited.

In 2018 Ratanpur Group and RSRM both defaulted on paying back their loan installments. Maksudur Rahman, Managing Director of Ratanpur Group, is also the director of South Bangla Agriculture and Commerce Bank. He said they failed to pay back the loan as the instalment amount was not "practical". The group filed a writ petition against being declared a loan defaulter with Bangladesh High Court.

Ratanpur Group had failed to pay 29 instalments but were able to secure a verdict from Bangladesh High Court that prevent them from being labeled a defaulter. It sought to reschedule their loans from Bangladesh Bank after Modern Steel Mills failed to pay back its loan. It reduced the issue price of RSRM. RSRM made 1 billion taka through issuing right shares on the Dhaka Stock Exchange.

In February 2020, Ratanpur Steel Re-rolling Mills (RSRM) saw a decline in their profits following low demand. In December 2020, The Business Standard mentioned Ratanpur Real Estate as one of a handful of companies that were illegally cutting hills in Chittagong.

On 31 March 2021, Bangladesh Power Development Board severed electric connection to two steel plants of Ratanpur Group over the non-payment of 400 million taka electricity bill.

Businesses 

 Ratanpur Jute Spinners Limited
 Ratanpur Shipping Services Limited
 Modern Steel Mills Limited
 Ratanpur Real Estate Limited
 Ratanpur Poultry and Agro Products Limited
 M. Rahman Steel Mills Limited
 Sapphire Corporation Limited
 Ratanpur Steel Re-Rolling Mills Limited
 Ratanpur Shipping Lines Limited
 Ratanpur Ship Re-cycling Industries Limited

References 

1984 establishments in Bangladesh
Conglomerate companies of Bangladesh

Organisations based in Chittagong